Gerrianne Raphael (born February 23, 1935) is an American stage, screen, and voice-over actress.  Though much of her career has been spent in the theatre,  she is perhaps best known for her major role as the voice of Pumyra in ThunderCats.

Personal life
Gerrianne Raphael was born in New York City on February 23, 1935, to Sidney, a concert pianist and Evelyn Raphael, a former actress.  She was married three times, most recently to actor Noah Keen, from 2004 until his death in 2019.  Her first husband was stage manager/actor, director John Weaver, (1955 - 1978).  Gregory Allen Hirsch (1979 - 1986) was her second husband, a theatrical lighting designer.  She has three daughters from her first marriage. She graduated from the Professional Children's School in New York City, in 1949.

Career 
Raphael's first professional performances were on radio when she was four years old  on Let's Pretend, a children’s program of fairy tales.  Her first Broadway show was at seven years of age in a play called Solitaire by John Van Druten.  She understudied Patricia Hitchcock, the daughter of Alfred Hitchcock.  Since then, her dozens of stage performances have included the landmark production of Threepenny Opera with Lotte Lenya and Beatrice Arthur and the original Broadway production of Man of La Mancha.  Having started in radio as a child, the progression to commercial voice-overs, "audiobooks" and cartoons came naturally. At one point Raphael had voice-overs for Revlon, Gloria Vanderbilt, Geritol and Helena Rubinstein all running at the same time.  She had also provided the voice for the littlest dwarf on the Ajax commercials in the 1950s.

Filmography

Theatre

References

External links
 

https://www.broadwayworld.com/people/Gerrianne-Raphael/
http://www.filmreference.com/film/35/Gerrianne-Raphael.html

Living people
American film actresses
American television actresses
American voice actresses
Actresses from New York City
1935 births
21st-century American women